El-Atek Mohamed (born 29 October 1970) is an Egyptian rower. He competed in the men's coxless four event at the 2000 Summer Olympics.

References

1970 births
Living people
Egyptian male rowers
Olympic rowers of Egypt
Rowers at the 2000 Summer Olympics